Chicomurex turschi is a species of sea snail, a marine gastropod mollusk in the family Muricidae, the murex snails or 'rock snails'.

Description

Distribution
This marine species occurs off Indonesia and Papua New Guinea

References

 Houart, R., 1981. Chicoreus (Chicomurex) turschi, a new Muricidae from New Guinea. The Nautilus 95(4): 186-188
 Merle D., Garrigues B. & Pointier J.-P. (2011) Fossil and Recent Muricidae of the world. Part Muricinae. Hackenheim: Conchbooks. 648 pp. page(s): 110

Muricidae
Gastropods described in 1981